Year 605 (DCV) was a common year starting on Friday (link will display the full calendar) of the Julian calendar. The denomination 605 for this year has been used since the early medieval period, when the Anno Domini calendar era became the prevalent method in Europe for naming years.

Events 
 By place 
 Byzantine Empire 
 Emperor Phocas recognizes Agilulf as king of the Lombards, and signs a peace treaty. He pays a tribute and cedes Orvieto (Central Italy), among other towns. The Byzantine army is withdrawn from the Balkan Peninsula.
 Phocas has Constantina, empress consort of Maurice, and her three daughters arrested. He accuses her of conspiracy, and has them executed at Chalcedon (Bithynia).

 Britain 
 King Æthelfrith annexes the neighboring kingdom of Deira (Northern England). The region between the Forth and Humber rivers will hereafter be known as Northumbria, the most powerful of the Anglo-Saxon kingdoms.

 Persia 
 As a result of a quarrel between the Lakhmids (Southern Iraq) and King Khosrau II, the Persian frontier with Arabia is no longer guarded (approximate date).

 Asia 

 Emperor Yángdi orders the capital to be transferred from Chang'an to Luoyang. He begins the construction of the Grand Canal, that will link existing waterways to the new Chinese capital; it will be built by a million laborers.
 Yángdi introduces an imperial examination, designed to select the best administrative officials (after they receive the jinshi) for the state; this begins a long bureaucratic tradition of scholar-officialdom in China.
 The Zhaozhou Bridge is completed under the Sui Dynasty, the earliest known fully stone open-spandrel segmental arch bridge in the world (although the earlier Roman Trajan's Bridge featured segmental arches).
 Amshuvarma becomes king of the Licchavi in Nepal. He is credited for opening trade routes to Tibet. His ruling period is known as the "Golden Period".

 Mesoamerica 
 Aj Ne' Yohl Mat becomes ruler (ajaw) of the Maya city of Palenque (Mexico). During his reign his kingdom is invaded by people from Calakmul."Chronicle of the Maya Kings and Queens" by Simon Martin and Nikolai Grube

Births 
 Chlodulf, bishop of Metz 
 Colmán, bishop of Lindisfarne (approximate date)
 Fatimah, daughter of Muhammad (approximate date)
 Yang You, puppet emperor of the Sui Dynasty (d. 619)
 Sisenand, king of the Visigoths (approximate date)
 Yang Tong, puppet emperor of the Sui Dynasty (d. 619)

Deaths 
 Alexander of Tralles, physician (approximate date)
 Brandub mac Echach, king of Uí Ceinnselaig (Ireland)
 Constantina, Byzantine empress (approximate date)
 Damian, Coptic Orthodox Patriarch of Alexandria

References